In baseball statistics, Batters Faced  (BF), also known as Total Batters Faced (TBF), is the number of batters who made a plate appearance before the pitcher in a game or in a season.

Cy Young is the all-time leader, facing 29,565 batters in his career. Young is the only player to face more than 26,000 career batters. Pud Galvin is second having faced 25,415 batters, and is the only other player to have faced more than 25,000 batters. A total of 17 players have faced over 20,000 batters in their careers, with all but two (Bobby Mathews and Roger Clemens) being in the Baseball Hall of Fame.

Key

List

References

Baseball-Reference.com

Major League Baseball statistics
Faced